Parents on Trial is a 1939 American drama film directed by Sam Nelson and starring Jean Parker,  Johnny Downs and Noah Beery Jr.

Plot

Cast
 Jean Parker as Susan Wesley
 Johnny Downs as Don Martin
 Noah Beery Jr. as Jerry Kearns
 Henry Kolker as James Wesley
 Virginia Brissac as Mrs. Martin
 Nana Bryant as Margaret Ames
 Linda Perry as 	Linda Ames 
 Richard Fiske as 	Lawrence Hastings
 Mary Gordon as 	Martha

References

Bibliography
 Lyons, Arthur. Death On The Cheap: The Lost B Movies Of Film Noir. Hachette Books, 2000.

External links
 

1939 films
1939 drama films
American drama films
Films directed by Sam Nelson
American black-and-white films
Columbia Pictures films
1930s English-language films
1930s American films